Hariota is a synonym for two different genera:

Hariota DC. is a synonym of Hatiora
Hariota Adans. is a synonym of Rhipsalis